Sainte-Maure-de-Touraine is a commune in the French department of Indre-et-Loire, Centre-Val de Loire.

The name of the commune is known for its goat cheese Sainte-Maure de Touraine which was first made in the province of Touraine.

Population

See also
Communes of the Indre-et-Loire department
Sainte-Maure de Touraine, a cheese named after the commune's name

References

Communes of Indre-et-Loire
Touraine